The Clear Creek Church was built between 1898 and 1903 and is located on Clear Creek Road  southeast of Camp Verde, Arizona.  It was listed in the National Register of Historic Places in 1975.

It was built of limestone blocks taken from Hayfield wash on the Middle Verde River. It has a high gable roof.

The builders placed in the cornerstone of the building a bible and a $5 gold piece (which was chiseled away in the 1920s). It was Camp Verde's only church until 1913, when it was transformed into the city's one-room schoolhouse. In 1946, the church was abandoned. Later the Clear Creek Church was looked after by the Camp Verde Historical Society.

References

Churches in Arizona
Churches on the National Register of Historic Places in Arizona
Churches completed in 1898
Buildings and structures in Yavapai County, Arizona
1898 establishments in Arizona Territory
National Register of Historic Places in Yavapai County, Arizona